Harout Pamboukjian (born July 1, 1950), known as Dzakh Harut (literally "Left Harout"), is an  Armenian pop singer living in Los Angeles. His Armenian dance, folk, and revolutionary and romantic songs make him a favorite among Armenians worldwide.

Early life 
Harout Pamboukjian was born on July 1, 1950, in Yerevan, Armenia (then part of the Soviet Union). In his early teens, he took lessons in many musical instruments including the guitar, the bouzouki and saz (stringed instruments), the dhol (drums) and the piano, later forming a band called Erebouni. His interest in music was initially influenced by his mother Tsaghik Shahakyan, who was also a singer. Erebouni went from village to village playing everything from Charles Aznavour to Deep Purple and Elvis, at weddings and universities. Due to restrictions under the Soviet Union, Harout and most of his family left Soviet Armenia in 1975. After a year in Lebanon, he went to Los Angeles and took up residence in Hollywood.
He has one son, who was born in 1980.

Music career 

Only two months after his arrival in Los Angeles, Harout put together a studio band and recorded his first album, "Our Eyir Astvats" (Where Were You, God?), in reference to the Armenian genocide at the Quad Teck studio.

That first album barely resembles the sound he has since become known for. Instead of the duduk or synths, there are clarinet, organ and a lot of bass. Only a few of the songs on the first  are dance-oriented, differing from the material that later made him popular at weddings. This made him popular and branded him the nickname "The Armenian Wedding Singer".

Harout has interpreted songs composed by artists such as Ruben Hakhverdyan, Harout Bedrossian and Arthur Meschian. But it's the centuries-old  folk tunes about protecting the soil and fighting in the highlands—"Antranik Pasha", "Sassouni Orore", "Msho Aghchig"—that appeal to his fans' nationalistic pride. He is most fond of  Ruben Hakhverdyan, including the 1996 almost all-acoustic "Yerke Nayev Aghotk Eh" (Songs Are Also Prayers). Harout has also covered favorites like "Nuné".

A year after the 1988 Armenian earthquake, which killed 25,000 people and left many more homeless, hundreds of thousands of fans looking for some kind of temporary diversion from the devastation, packed the Hrazdan Stadium and Karen Demirchyan Complex to hear 28 concerts by Harout.

In 2008, Harout appeared as children's music singer Bread Harrity on the sketch comedy show Tim and Eric Awesome Show, Great Job!, performing a song about spaghetti and meatballs.

Pamboukjian has released over 20 albums. Some of his famous interpretations include "Asmar Aghchig" (Dark Skinned Girl), "Zokanch" (Mother-in-law), "Msho Aghchig" (Girl from Mush), "Msho Dashter" (Fields of Mush), "Hye Kacher" (Armenian Heroes), "50 Daree" (50 Years) and "Hey Jan Ghapama"

Discography

Studio albums
Oour Eyir Ahstvats (1976)
Ballad Hayrenyatz (1977)
Aravoditz Irigoun (1978)
Harout (1979)
Minchev Ekouts (1980)
In Memory Of Those Who Gave Their Lives (1980)
Kedi Ayn Apin (1981)
Yerp Alegodz Dzovu Vra (1982)
Top’82 (1982)
Heratsadz Engerner (1983)
Vol 12 (1984)
Hayi Achker (1986)
Hay Baliknerin (1988)
Knas Parov (1989)
Yeregoyan Yerevan (1991)
Pari Daretarts (1993)
Jambanere Bingyoli (feat. Rouzan Pamboukjian) (1994)
The Golden Album (1997)
Yerke Nayev Aghotk E (feat. Ruben Hakhverdyan) (2000)
Harout 2000/Haroutn Hayots (2000)
My Life (2013)

Live albums
Live In Beirut (1980)
Live In Concert Vol. 1 (1987)
Live In Los Angeles (1988)
National & Patriotic Songs Vol. 1 Live (1997)
National & Patriotic Songs Vol. 2 Live (1997)
National & Patriotic Songs Vol. 3 Live (1997)
Live In Concert Vol. 2 (1997)
Live In California (2001)
Live In Dolby Theatre (2017)
Live In France (2018)

Compilation albums
Harout Box Set - The Best of 1974-1984 (1984)
25 Dance Hits (1998)
Hit Romances: 50 Daris (1999)
Romantic Flashback (1999)
Patriotic Songs (2000)
Patriotic Collection (2000)
Love Songs (2000)
Dance Party Mix (2000)
Toukh Achker (2003) 
Paylogh Asdgher (2005)

Singles and EPs
Marali  Bes (1981)
Sari Jampov (1981)
Ser Jan (1981)
Toukh Acher (1981)
Im Arajin Ser (1981)
Mer Hayrenik (1997)
Menag Es Mnatsel (feat. Silvi) (2006)
Sareri Kami (feat. Rouben Hakhverdyan) (2012) 
Tariner (feat. Sirusho) (2014)
Ancir Ay Getak (feat. Armenchik) (2014)
Angakh Hayastan (feat. Tigran Asatryan & Sammy Flash) (2016)
Te Acheres (feat. Super Sako) (2016)
Zoqanch (feat. Dj Donz) (2017)
Te Achers Kez Voronem (2017)
Karmir Tsaghik Me Garuni (feat. Anna Boyrazyan) (2017)
Tebi Sassoun (feat. Karnig Sarkissian) (2018)
Ha Nina Nina (feat. Sammy Flash) (2018)
Es Arantz Kez (2018)
Yerp Siroum Es Indz (2018)
Karmir Tsaghik (feat. Anna Boyrazyan) (2019)
Tsovn E Sharachum (2019)

References

External links 
 

1950 births
Living people
Musicians from Yerevan
Soviet emigrants to the United States
American male pop singers
20th-century Armenian male singers
American people of Armenian descent
Armenian pop singers
21st-century Armenian male singers